Fuck is an English term for the act of sexual intercourse, also used as an intensifier or interjection, and generally considered vulgar.

Fuck or fucks may also refer to:

People
 Johann Fück (1894–1974), German orientalist
 Karl Wilhelm Gottlieb Leopold Fuckel, botanist, sometimes abbreviated Fuck., to refer to him when citing a botanical name
 Argel Fucks (born 1974), Brazilian footballer
 Ralf Fücks (born 1951), German politician
 Reinhardt Adolfo Fuck, Brazilian geologist

Art, entertainment, and media

Film
 Fuck, aka Blue Movie, a 1969 film by Andy Warhol, beginning Golden Age of Porn
 Fuck (film), a 2005 documentary about the word
 "One fuck rule", an allegation that MPAA films rated PG-13 are only allowed one use of the word "fuck".

Literature
Fuck: Word Taboo and Protecting Our First Amendment Liberties (2009), a non-fiction book by Christopher M. Fairman that followed up an eponymous 2007 article published in the Cardozo Law Review
Fuck (1991–1993 serial), by Chester Brown compiled as the graphic novel I Never Liked You (1994)

Music

Groups
 Fuck (band), an American indie rock band formed in 1994

Albums
 Fuck (album), an album by the band Fuck
 Fuck (EP), by Buckcherry
 For Unlawful Carnal Knowledge (F.U.C.K.), an album by Van Halen

Songs
 "Foxtrot Uniform Charlie Kilo" ("F.U.C.K"), a song by the Bloodhound Gang
 "Fuck", a song by Bring Me the Horizon from their album There Is a Hell Believe Me I've Seen It. There Is a Heaven Let's Keep It a Secret

Science
 fucK, the gene name for the gene that encodes the enzyme L-Fuculose kinase

See also
 
 Fuck It (disambiguation)
 Fuck me (disambiguation)
 Fuck the Police (disambiguation)
 Fuck the World (disambiguation)
 Fuck You (disambiguation)
 Fucking (disambiguation)
 Holy fuck (disambiguation)
 WTF (disambiguation)
 FCUK, an alternative international name for French Connection clothing line's UK operation
 Fock, a surname (including a list of people with the name)
 Focker (disambiguation)
 Fook (disambiguation)
 Fuca (disambiguation)
 Fuchs (disambiguation)
 P.H.U.Q., album by the Wildhearts